Robbsia andropogonis is a soil bacterium that can cause leaf, bud, and stem spotting on carnation, although it is not a disease of great economical significance.

References 

Burkholderiaceae
Bacterial plant pathogens and diseases
Eudicot diseases
Bacteria described in 1911